Renato Scorticati (25 June 1908 – 23 January 1978) was an Italian racing cyclist. He rode in the 1933 Tour de France.

References

External links
 

1908 births
1978 deaths
Italian male cyclists
Place of birth missing
Sportspeople from Reggio Emilia
Cyclists from Emilia-Romagna